Monaghan General Hospital is a hospital in the town of Monaghan, County Monaghan, Ireland.

History and operations
The hospital has its origins in several of the former Monaghan County Jail buildings which were converted for clinical use as Monaghan Infirmary after purchase in the 1890s by a Board of Governors for a local medical facility.  The first infirmary opened in 1896.  The old main jail building was razed and the building of a new County Hospital commenced in 1933. The purpose-built hospital was officially opened on the site in 1938.

In 2006 the hospital's treatment room function was moved from a doctor-led to a nurse-led basis, with many cases to be handled at Cavan General Hospital thereafter.  On 22 July 2009, all acute care ceased at Monaghan, with only day surgery and minor injury treatment to continue at the location, along with the provision of 13 "step-down" and 13 rehabilitation beds.  The decision, which led to the redeployment of 130 staff, was opposed by local politicians, general practitioners, nurses and some consultants.

Operations
Since the hospital ceased providing acute services in 2009, it has focussed on rehabilitation and "step-down" services. A minor injuries unit remains on the site, as do out-patient and day operations.

Monaghan Hospital is managed by one of the Health Service Executive's hospital groups, RCSI Hospitals, formerly the Dublin North-East Group, and the hospital and Cavan General Hospital are run as a single operation.

References

Hospitals in County Monaghan
Buildings and structures in Monaghan (town)
Health Service Executive hospitals
1896 establishments in Ireland
Hospitals established in 1896
Hospital buildings completed in 1938
20th-century architecture in the Republic of Ireland